Ozyorno-Kuznetsovo is a rural locality (a selo) and the administrative center of Ozyorno-Kuznetsovsky Selsoviet, Uglovsky District, Altai Krai, Russia. The population was 1,243 as of 2013. It was founded in 1813. There are 10 streets.

Geography 
Ozyorno-Kuznetsovo is located 23 km north of Uglovskoye (the district's administrative centre) by road. Ozyorno-Kuznetsovsky Leskhoz is the nearest rural locality.

References 

Rural localities in Uglovsky District, Altai Krai